The  Green Bay Blizzard season was the team's sixteenth season as a professional indoor football franchise and ninth in the Indoor Football League (IFL). The Blizzard were one of six teams that competed in the IFL for the 2018 season.

The Blizzard played their home games at the Resch Center in the Green Bay suburb of Ashwaubenon, Wisconsin. For the first five games, the team was coached by Chris Williams in his third season with the team. Williams was fired March 29 after going 0–5. Special teams and defensive coach Corey Roberson took over as the interim head coach.

Standings

Schedule
Key:

Regular season
All start times are local

Roster

References

External links
Green Bay Blizzard official website
Green Bay Blizzard official statistics
Green Bay Blizzard at Green Bay Press-Gazette

Green Bay Blizzard seasons
Green Bay Blizzard
Green Bay Blizzard